Gulfgate Center, also known as Gulfgate Shopping City or Gulfgate Center, is a shopping center located in the East End, Houston, Texas, United States. The mall is located northwest of the intersection of the Gulf Freeway and Interstate 610. This is not an indoor shopping mall, it is a center of individual retail stores.

History
It was the first regional mall in the Houston area, opening as Gulfgate Shopping Center on 20 September 1956 with Joske's, Sakowitz, Weingarten's, J.J. Newberry and W. T. Grant.  The architects were John Graham & Company.

Popularly known as Gulfgate Mall, many remember this being the first Air Conditioned mall in America

Gulfgate Kiddieland opened in the mall on 21 March 1957.

MSC had a continuing operation there until additional office, engineering and laboratory space could be leased and made ready for occupation. Operations at the Gulfgate offices were largely concerned with procurement, personnel and public affairs.

The shopping center was enclosed around 1967 and, after years of decline and competition, shuttered in 2000. In 2001 the original mall and the former Mervyns (across Woodridge) were demolished and redeveloped into a strip mall configuration, anchored by H-E-B, Best Buy, Office Depot, Marshalls, and Lowe's.

Anchors
H-E-B
Best Buy
Old Navy
Marshalls
Ross Dress for Less
Staples
Lowe's (Gulfgate West across Woodridge)
Claire's
Starbucks
Panda Express
The Children's Place
Wingstop
Party City
Cicis
KFC
Chuck E. Cheese

Former mall anchors
All stores demolished in 2001
Joske's 228,900 sq. ft. (became Dillard's Clearance Center in 1987)
Sakowitz 128,900 sq. ft. (closed in 1985, remained vacant)
J.J. Newberry 69,400 sq. ft. (became HJ Wilson Catalog Showroom on unknown date)
W. T. Grant (closed in 1976)
Weingarten's (closed in 1983, became Pic 'N' Save, then MacFrugal's in 1991)
H. J. Wilson Co. (became Service Merchandise in 1985)
Dillard's Clearance Center (closed in 1997, remained vacant)
Service Merchandise (closed in 1999, remained vacant)
MacFrugal's (closed in 2000)
Anna's Linens (closed in 2015)

Former Gulfgate West anchors
Globe Shopping City Membership Store (closed in 1978 and became FedMart)
FedMart Membership Store (closed in 1982 and became Mervyns in 1984)
Mervyns (closed in 1991 and remained vacant for several years until it was demolished and rebuilt as Lowe's in 2001)

References

External links
Barlow, Jim. "More to Gulfgate than meets the eye." Houston Chronicle. Sunday July 10, 2001. Business 1.
Vaughn, Carol E. "Gulfgate demolition building up neighborhood." Houston Chronicle. March 14, 2001.

Shopping malls in Houston
Shopping malls established in 1956